Pheni may refer to:

 Khaja sweet in Odisha, India
 Sutarfeni, another Indian sweet